Halieutopsis echinoderma, also known as the spiny deepsea batfish, is a species of fish in the family Ogcocephalidae.

The fish is found from eastern Taiwan and northeastern Australia.

References

Ogcocephalidae
Marine fish genera
Fish described in 2022
Taxa named by Hans Hsuan-Ching Ho